Crizanlizumab, sold under the brand name Adakveo among others, is a monoclonal antibody medication that binds to P-selectin. It is a medication used to reduce the frequency of vaso-occlusive crisis in people aged 16 years and older who have sickle cell anemia. It is given by injection into a vein.

The most common side effects include joint pain, nausea, back pain, fever and abdominal (belly) pain.

Crizanlizumab was approved for medical use in the United States in November 2019. The U.S. Food and Drug Administration (FDA) considers it to be a first-in-class medication.

Medical uses 
Crizanlizumab is indicated for the prevention of recurrent vaso occlusive crises in sickle cell disease patients aged 16 years and older. It can be given as an add on therapy to hydroxyurea/hydroxycarbamide (HU/HC) or as monotherapy in patients for whom HU/HC is inappropriate or inadequate.

Vaso-occlusive crisis is a common and painful complication of sickle cell disease that occurs when blood circulation is obstructed by sickled red blood cells (red cells are usually round and flexible, but sometimes many red cells in a person with sickle cell anemia will become rigid and crescent-shaped due to polymerization of hemoglobin).

Pathophysiology
P-selectin molecules are present on the surface of activated platelets and vascular endothelial cells and have been linked to sickle cell vaso-occlusive crises.

History
The US Food and Drug Administration (FDA) approved crizanlizumab based on evidence from one clinical trial (Trial 1/NCT01895361) of 132 patients with sickle cell diseases who had a history of vaso-occlusive crisis. The trial was conducted at 60 sites in the United States, Brazil and Jamaica.

The FDA granted the application for crizanlizumab priority review, breakthrough therapy designation, and orphan drug designation. The FDA granted approval of Adakveo to Novartis.

References

External links
 
 

Breakthrough therapy
Hematology
Monoclonal antibodies
Orphan drugs
Sickle-cell disease